Trent Joseph Steed (born 6 May 1977) is a former medley swimmer who competed for Australia at the 1996 Summer Olympics in Atlanta.  There he finished in 15th position in the 400-metre individual medley, clocking a time of 4:29.35 in the B-Final.  He was an Australian Institute of Sport scholarship holder.

See also
 List of Commonwealth Games medallists in swimming (men)

References

1977 births
Living people
Australian male medley swimmers
Swimmers from Sydney
Olympic swimmers of Australia
Swimmers at the 1996 Summer Olympics
Australian Institute of Sport swimmers
Commonwealth Games medallists in swimming
Commonwealth Games gold medallists for Australia
Swimmers at the 1998 Commonwealth Games
20th-century Australian people
Medallists at the 1998 Commonwealth Games